Holmengrå Lighthouse is a coastal lighthouse located in the municipality of Fedje in Vestland county, Norway.  It sits on a tiny island in the mouth of the Fensfjorden and Fedjefjorden, near a busy shipping lane headed to the Mongstad industrial area.

History
The lighthouse was established in 1892. A radio beacon was active from 1947 to 1992.

The lighthouse emits a white, red, or green light (depending on direction) using a 3 seconds on, 3 seconds off pattern.

See also
 List of lighthouses in Norway
 Lighthouses in Norway

References

External links

 Norsk Fyrhistorisk Forening 

Fedje
Lighthouses completed in 1892
Lighthouses in Vestland